Okhotsky-Perevoz is a rural locality (a selo), the only inhabited locality, and the administrative center of Okhot-Perevozovsky Rural Okrug of Tomponsky District in the Sakha Republic, Russia, located  from Khandyga, the administrative center of the district. Its population as of the 2010 Census was 142, down from 157 recorded during the 2002 Census.

Climate
Okhotsky-Perevoz has an extreme subarctic climate (Köppen Dfd) with extremely cold, long winters, and short, damp summers.

References

Notes

Sources
Official website of the Sakha Republic. Registry of the Administrative-Territorial Divisions of the Sakha Republic. Tomponsky District. 

Rural localities in Tomponsky District